Olaus Magnus (October 1490 – 1 August 1557) was a Swedish writer, cartographer, and Catholic clergyman.

Biography 

Olaus Magnus (a Latin translation of his birth name Olof Månsson) was born in Linköping in October 1490. Like his elder brother, Sweden's last Catholic archbishop Johannes Magnus, he obtained several ecclesiastical preferments, among them a canonry at Uppsala and Linköping, and the archdeaconry of Strängnäs. He was furthermore employed on various diplomatic services after his mission to Rome in 1524, on behalf of Gustav I of Sweden (Vasa), to procure the appointment of Olaus Magnus' brother Johannes Magnus as archbishop of Uppsala. He remained abroad dealing with foreign affairs and is known to have sent home a document that contained agreed trade-relations with the Netherlands. With the success of the reformation in Sweden, his attachment to the Catholic church led him to stay abroad for good where he accompanied his brother in Poland. They were both exiled and Magnus' Swedish belongings were confiscated in 1530.

Settling in Rome in 1537, he acted as his brother's secretary. At the death of his brother Johannes in 1544, Pope Paul III issued him as Johannes's successor as Archbishop of Uppsala; admittedly nothing more than a title, as Sweden was not Catholic anymore and Olaus was banned. In 1545, Pope Paul III sent him to the Council of Trent where he attended meetings until 1549. Later, he became canon of St. Lambert's Cathedral in Liège. King Sigismund I of Poland offered him a canonry at Poznań and he spent the remainder of his life with the monastery of St. Brigitta in Rome, where he subsisted on a pension assigned him by the Pope. He died on 1 August 1557 at the age of about 67.

Name
His original Swedish name was Olof Månsson (his last name meaning "son of Måns"; Magnus is a Latinized version of his patronymic second name, and not the literal personal epithet meaning "great").

Works 

He is best remembered as the author of the famous Historia de Gentibus Septentrionalibus (A Description of the Northern Peoples), printed in Rome 1555, a patriotic work of folklore and history which long remained for the rest of Europe the authority on Swedish matters. This text on dark winters, violent currents and beasts of the sea amazed the rest of Europe. It was translated into Italian (1565), German (1567), English (1658) and Dutch (1665), and not until 1909 into Swedish. Abridgments of the work appeared also at Antwerp (1558 and 1562), Paris (1561), Amsterdam (1586), Frankfort (1618) and Leiden (1652). It is still today a valuable repertory of much curious information in regard to Scandinavian customs and folklore. 
A translation of the Latin title page goes:
"Olaus Magnus Gothus', the Upsala Archbishops', history of the Nordic people's different manners and camps, also about the wonderful differences in customs, holy practices, superstitions, bodily exercises, government and food keeping; further on war, buildings and wonderful aids; further on metals and different kinds of animals, that live in these neighbourhoods (...)".

Olaus had already earlier written Carta marina et Descriptio septemtrionalium terrarum ac mirabilium rerum in eis contentarum, diligentissime elaborata Anno Domini 1539 Veneciis liberalitate Reverendissimi Domini Ieronimi Quirini, which translates as "A Marine map and Description of the Northern Lands and of their Marvels, most carefully drawn up at Venice in the year 1539 through the generous assistance of the Most Honourable Lord and Patriarch Hieronymo Quirino". 
The Italian title translates to "A little book, that more closely explains a map of the Nordic cold, beyond the Germanic sea located country, which presents its extremely peculiar, priorly known neither to Greeks or Latins, wonders of nature." It included a map of Northern Europe with a map of Scandinavia, which was rediscovered by Oscar Brenner in 1886 in the München state library and shown to be the most accurate depiction of its time. The map is referred to as "carta marina", and consists of 9 parts, and is remarkably large: 125 cm tall and 170 cm wide.

Following the death of his brother, he also let historical works that the brother had written be published.

Present day oceanographers rediscovered Olaus Magnus' eye for detail (disregarding elements like the sea monsters) and a series of scientific publications followed on Olaus' truthful depiction of currents between Iceland and the Faroe Islands.

External links
Drømmen om hjemlandet The dream about the country of origin
 Works by Olaus Magnus in digital library Polona

References 

 
 Carta Marina James Bell Ford Library, Minnesota
 Carta Marina satellite images The Plymouth Marine Laboratory Remote Sensing Group webpage on correlations with current oceanography.
 

1490 births
1557 deaths
16th-century Latin-language writers
16th-century Swedish writers
People from Östergötland
Swedish cartographers
Swedish diplomats
16th-century Swedish historians
16th-century cartographers
16th-century diplomats
16th-century Roman Catholic bishops in Sweden
University of Rostock alumni